Azer Bušuladžić (born 12 November 1991) is a Bosnian professional footballer who plays for Vejle Boldklub. He plays as a defensive midfielder and central midfielder.

Club career
Bušuladžić was born on 12 November 1991 in Trebinje, Bosnia and Herzegovina, and at the age of four, due to the Bosnian war he immigrated with his family to Denmark. From 2009 to 2014 he played in Vejle Boldklub (114 appearances in all competitions) and in the 2014 he signed a two years' contract with OB (62 appearances in all competitions). During his period spent at Dinamo București (43 appearances in all competitions) he won the 2016–17 Cupa Ligii, which was the first trophy won by the club after 5 years. On 16 August 2017, he signed a two years contract with Greek Superleague club Atromitos for an undisclosed fee.

On 23 May 2022 it was confirmed, that Bušuladžić had returned to Vejle Boldklub, signing a deal until June 2024.

Career statistics

Club

Honours

Club
Dinamo București
Cupa Ligii: 2016–17

References

1991 births
Living people
People from Trebinje
Bosnia and Herzegovina emigrants to Denmark
Association football midfielders
Bosnia and Herzegovina footballers
Danish men's footballers
Vejle Boldklub players
Odense Boldklub players
FC Dinamo București players
Atromitos F.C. players
Arka Gdynia players
Anorthosis Famagusta F.C. players
Danish 1st Division players
Danish Superliga players
Liga I players
Super League Greece players
Ekstraklasa players
Cypriot First Division players
Bosnia and Herzegovina expatriate footballers
Expatriate footballers in Romania
Bosnia and Herzegovina expatriate sportspeople in Romania
Expatriate footballers in Greece
Bosnia and Herzegovina expatriate sportspeople in Greece
Expatriate footballers in Poland
Bosnia and Herzegovina expatriate sportspeople in Poland
Expatriate footballers in Cyprus
Bosnia and Herzegovina expatriate sportspeople in Cyprus